Lam Pla Thio is a khwaeng (subdistrict) of Lat Krabang District, in Bangkok, Thailand. In 2019, it had a total population of 24,878 people.

References

Subdistricts of Bangkok
Lat Krabang district